ASRA or Asra may refer to:

Organizations
Aberdeen Schools Rowing Association
Alberta Science and Research Authority
American Show Racer Association
American Sportbike Racing Association
Association for the Study of Reptilia and Amphibia
Auckland Service Rifle Association
Australasian Sound Recording Association
Australian Sport Rotorcraft Association

Legislation
Agricultural Services Reorganization Act
American Sovereignty Restoration Act

Other uses
 Austrian Sustainability Reporting Awards (founded 2000) founded by Christine Maria Jasch
 Benthophiloides turcomanus, a species of goby sometimes placed in its own genus Asra

See also

 
 
 
 Aasra
 Asara (disambiguation)
 Azra (disambiguation)